Dharan, Nepal is emerging as an education hub. The city has the highest number of centers of higher education in Nepal. This list contains educational institutions such as Universities, colleges, and high schools in Dharan.

Universities
 B.P. Koirala Institute of Health Sciences

Colleges

 Mahendra Multiple Campus
 Central Campus of Technology (Hattisar) Dharan-14
 UN College Dharan-16
 Purwanchal Campus - Tribhuvan University
 Dharan College of Management - affiliated to the Purbanchal University
 Birendra Memorial College - affiliated to the Tribhuvan University
 Dharan Multiple Campus, Dharan-16, affiliated to the Tribhuvan University
 Alpine College, Dharan-10
 Dharan Model College, Dharan-4
 Dharan City College, Dharan-12
 National Multiple College, Dharan-4
 Kaushiki Campus, Dharan-16
 Sagarmatha College
 Dharan Adarsha College
 Pindeshwor Vidyapeeth - affiliated to the Nepal Sanskrit University
 Sunsari Technical College, Dharan-4
 Dharan Mega College, Dharan-12
 Sarada Balika Namuna Multiple College, Dharan-16

High schools

 Bishnu Memorial Higher Secondary School, Dharan-9
 Aims Academy, Chatara Line, Dharan, 12
 Bhaldhunga Higher Secondary School, Dharan-20
 Bhanusmriti Secondary School, Dharan-3
 Carmel High School, Buddha Road, Dharan-18
 Children's Academy English Boarding School (Pindeshowr Chowk), Dharan-15
 Delhi Public School, Dharan-18
 Depot Higher Secondary School, Dharan 18
 Dharan Adarsha Boarding Higher Secondary School, Dharan-4
 Dharan Higher Secondary School (Dhss), Dharan-4
 Eureka Higher Secondary School, Laxmi Sadak, Dharan-4
 Gem Secondary Boarding School, Dharan 18
 Gyanodaya Secondary Boarding School, Pindeswari Chowk, Dharan-15
 Gyanodaya Secondary High School, Dharan-11
 Hibiscus Boarding School, Dharan
 Holy Land International School, Dharan-15
 Junior Pioneers, Dharan
 K.K. International School, Dharan-15
 Koshi Secondary English Boarding School, Dharan-8
 National Academy Of Applied Science And Technology (Naast College), Dharan-16
 Navjyoti Catholic English School (Recently Upgraded To College), Dharan-15
 Oasis English High School, Dharan-11
 Panchayat Higher Secondary School, Dharan 10
 Parvat Secondary Boarding School, Dharan-19
 Pravat Higher Secondary School, Chatara Line, Dharan-12
 Prithvi Cambridge English School, Dharan-19
 Sainik Awasiya Mahavidyalaya (Samd), Dharan-13
 Saraswati English Boarding School, Dharan-8
 Shree Laboratory Higher Secondary School, Dharan-8
 Shree Panchakanya Secondary School, Dharan-17
 Shree Public Higher Secondary School (Phushre), Dharan-13
 Shree Public Higher Secondary School, Dharan-12
 Shree Sarada Balika Higher Secondary School, Dharan-16
 Shree Saraswati Higher Secondary School, Dharan-6
 Shree Shiksha Sadan Higher Secondary School, Sadan Road, Dharan-15
 Shree Shikshya Niketan Higher Secondary School, Dharan-6
 Sion School, Jorshakuwa, Dharan- 16
 Small Heaven English Boarding School, Dharan-13
 St. Joseph English Boarding School, Dharan 17, Bichghopa
 Summit Higher Secondary Boarding School, Bagaicha Line, Dharan-9
 Sunakhari Academy, Chatraline Dharan-12
 Victory Residential Secondary School, Dharan-11
 Vijayapur Higher Secondary School, Dharan 14

References

Sunsari District
Dharan